Weak13 is an English alternative rock band founded in Kidderminster, West Midlands, England, by Nick J. Townsend in 1999.  The band's underground nature was first documented in the book Get Your Kicks on the A456 published in October 2009 and written by author John Combe. After working with filmmaker Chris Stone in 2010, their song "Wake Down" won Best Music Video at the London Limelight Film & Arts Awards. On 11 November 2011, they released an experimental live album titled Live Ammo. In 2011, a follow up music video "You Don't Love Me" was released directed by Martyn Kilvert.

In 2012, the band consisting of Nick J. Townsend, Wesley Smith and Neel Parmar began work on recording the first professional Weak13 studio album with producer John Stewart from British band Eight Great Fears; the They Live album was completed in 2015. They Live was first heard in public at a Birmingham nightclub called Plug located in Digbeth on 6 November 2015. Henry Smithson was chosen to master the They Live album after the band heard his previous work for Stereophonics.

Weak13 began working with film makers Greg Gdow and Margaret Mas of FiftySeven Studios in 2013 to produce a trilogy of music videos to promote demo versions of songs "Joke", "Sex Pest" and "Go Away". All three of these songs became later rerecorded in the studio. "Go Away" was not included on the final version of the debut album.

During 2015 the band participated in a charity nude calendar to raise money for Macmillan Cancer Support;. The three piece were seen naked in the calendar as the month of March along with The Darkness frontman  Justin Hawkins who appeared as Mr September.

Awards
 Best music video – London Limelight Film & Arts Awards 2010 for "Wake Down", directed by Chris Stone

Band members
 Nick J. Townsend - vocals and guitar (1999 – present)
 Wesley Smith - bass guitar and backing vocals (2009 – present)
 Neel Parmar - drums (2009 – present)

Discography

Studio albums

Live albums

References

External links
 Official website
 YouTube

English alternative rock groups
English rock music groups
Musical groups established in 1999
1999 establishments in England